The City of Brisbane in Queensland, Australia, is home to a large number of cultural institutions, museums and historic sites, several of which have worldwide acclaim.

See also
Culture of Brisbane
List of public art in Brisbane
List of museums in Queensland
List of museums in Australia

References 

Brisbane
Brisbane
 
Brisbane, museums
Brisbane-related lists
Lists of buildings and structures in Brisbane
Lists of tourist attractions in Queensland